Murbad is the name of a settlement in Fujairah.

Populated places in the Emirate of Fujairah